Kodigo Penal: The Valderrama Case is a 1980 Filipino action film directed by Mike Relon Makiling.

Cast
Ramon Zamora
Alma Moreno
Rey Malonzo
Trixia Gomez
Tina Monasterio
Ace Vergel
Philip Gamboa
Katherine Santos
Conrad Poe
Joy Navarro
Celso ad'Castillo
Rolando Gonzalez
Tsing Tong Tsai
Protacio Dee
Angelo Ventura
Val Iglesia
Danny Riel
Eric Francisco

External links

1980 films
Filipino-language films
Philippine action films
1980s Tagalog-language films
Films directed by Mike Relon Makiling